The Yasuo Fukuda Cabinet governed Japan under the leadership of Prime Minister Yasuo Fukuda from September 2007 to September 2008. The government was a coalition between the Liberal Democratic Party and the Komeito and controlled both the upper and lower houses of the National Diet.

Background

Election of the Prime Minister

Lists of Ministers 

R = Member of the House of Representatives
C = Member of the House of Councillors

Cabinet

Reshuffled Cabinet

References

External links 
Pages at the Kantei (English website):
 Yasuo Fukuda Administration 
 List of Ministers 
 (Reshuffled)

Cabinet of Japan
2007 establishments in Japan
2008 disestablishments in Japan
Cabinets established in 2007
Cabinets disestablished in 2008